Miloslav Mečíř defeated Michiel Schapers  6–4, 6–3, 3–6, 6–4 to win the 1986 Heineken Open singles competition. Chris Lewis was the champion but did not defend his title.

Seeds
A champion seed is indicated in bold text while text in italics indicates the round in which that seed was eliminated.

  Bud Schultz (final)
  Ben Testerman (second round)
  Kelly Evernden (second round)
  Michiel Schapers (second round)
  Wally Masur (semifinals)
  Peter Doohan (first round)
  Broderick Dyke (first round)
  Russell Simpson (second round)

Draw

 NB: The Final was the best of 5 sets while all other rounds were the best of 3 sets.

Final

Section 1

Section 2

External links
 Association of Tennis Professional (ATP) – 1986 Men's Singles draw

Singles
ATP Auckland Open